Charles Fletcher (August 26, 1884 – May 2, 1965) was an American composer. His work was part of the music event in the art competition at the 1932 Summer Olympics.

References

1884 births
1965 deaths
American male composers
Olympic competitors in art competitions
People from Warren County, Illinois
20th-century American male musicians